Stayen is a football stadium in Sint-Truiden, Belgium.  It is the home ground of STVV.  The stadium holds 14,600 after its most recent rebuild.

The original stadium was built in 1927.   The name "Stayen" is a local dialect word for "Staden", an old quarter of the town on its western side.   Between the 1950s and 2009 the word was normally written as "Staaien".   One regularly applied soubriquet is "Hel van Stayen" ("Hell of Stayen"), used on behalf of top teams that suffer defeats in the stadium.

The Stayen Hotel is built into the north side of the stadium: 20 of its rooms overlook the pitch.

From February 2023, the Japanese company "Daio Wasabi Farm" acquired the naming rights of the stadium, and named it "Daio Wasabi Stayen Stadium". This is the first time in history for a Belgian league that a Japanese company has acquired the naming rights for a stadium.

References

Sports venues completed in 1927
Football venues in Flanders
Sports venues in Limburg (Belgium)
Sint-Truidense V.V.